Papatoetoe High School (PHS) is a secondary school (years 9–13) in Papatoetoe suburb of Auckland, New Zealand.

History
Papatoetoe High School was established in 1956.

February 2021 COVID-19 outbreak
On 14 February, a Year 9 student at Papatoetoe High School was identified as one of three community cases of COVID-19 in Papatoetoe, South Auckland. In response, Principal Vaughan Couillaut announced that the school will close on Monday and Tuesday. Five teachers and 28 students at the school were identified as close contacts of the infected student while all other students and staff at the school were considered "casual" contacts. That same day, anyone attending or working at the high school was advised to seek a COVID-19 test. In addition the New Zealand Government imposed an Alert Level 3 lockdown on the Auckland region with restrictions on public gatherings, travel, and economic activities in order to gather more information about the Papatoetoe community outbreak.

On 17 February, two more students tested positive for COVID-19. The new cases were siblings, with the younger sibling being a close contact of the index case.

Enrolment 
At the September 2018 Education Review Office (ERO) review of the school, Papatoetoe High School had 1396 students enrolled. 52% of students were male and 48% were female. The prioritised ethnic composition was 37% Indian, 16% Māori, 13% Samoan, 7% Tongan, 9% South East Asian, 5% Chinese, 4% Cook Islands Maori, 3% other Pacific peoples, 3% New Zealand European, and 3% other ethnic groups.

Principals
 Colin McGill 1956–1966
 Bruce Hunter 1966–1978
 Hugh Richards 1978–1996
 Peter Gall 1996–2016
 Vaughan Couillault 2016–present

Notable alumni

 Fepulea'i Margie Apa, healthcare chief executive
 Georgina Beyer, former Labour Member of Parliament
 Dillon Boucher, New Zealand's most decorated basketballer and former assistant coach of the Tall Blacks and former small forward for the New Zealand Breakers
 Con Psy, real name David Dallas, member of the band Frontline
 Charlie Faumuina, Auckland and All Blacks player
 Phil Goff, former Mayor of Auckland, former MP for Mount Roskill, former Leader of the Opposition (2008–11)
 Mark Gosche, former Labour Member of Parliament
 Ricki Herbert, former All White and former manager of All Whites and Wellington Phoenix
 Emma Hunter, Samoan New Zealander Olympic swimmer
 David Shearer (1971–75), MP for Mount Albert, humanitarian worker, Leader of the Opposition (2011–2013)
 Ish Sodhi, Northern Districts player and member of the New Zealand national cricket team
 Young Sid, real name Sidney Diamond, rapper

Notes

 

Secondary schools in Auckland
Educational institutions established in 1956
1956 establishments in New Zealand
Ōtara-Papatoetoe Local Board Area